The 2006 Australian Performance Car Championship was a CAMS sanctioned Australian motor racing championship for production-based touring cars. It was the second championship to be contested under the Australian Performance Car Championship name with similar titles having been run in 2003 and 2004 as the Australian GT Performance Car Championship. GT Performance Racing Pty Ltd was appointed by CAMS as the Category Manager for the 2006 championship.

The championship was won by Gary Holt driving a Mitsubishi Lancer RS Evo VIII. It was Holt's first title after racing in various categories of high performance sedans from V8 Supercars to Production Cars since 1999. Beric Lynton was second in a BMW M3 with defending champion Peter Floyd third in a HSV GTS.

Calendar
The championship was contested over a seven round series.

Classes
Car competed in two classes, Outright and Privateer. The latter class was for non-current model vehicles running on a control tyre.

Points system
Championship points were awarded on the results of each race as per the following table:

 

In addition, 3 points were awarded to the driver gaining Pole Position for Race 1 at each round.

The same points score structure was applied for the Privateers Cup award.

Results

References

External links
 Century 21 Racing and Gary Holt champions, news.driverdb.com, as archived at web.archive.org

Australian Performance Car Championship
Performance Car Championship